The discography of American record producer Jake One includes a list of songs produced, co-produced and remixed by year, artists, album and title.

Production credits

1998
 
Conception Records - Walkman Rotation
 02. "World Premier"
 03. "No Introduction / No Introdeezy"
 11. "Essay on Pseudo-ism"
 12. "Thoughts I Generate"
 15. "Neva Scared"

1999
 
Trump Tight Records - Eyez on the Prize
 03. "Eyez on the Prize" (performed by Lord Tariq & Peter Gunz and Kutfather)
 06. "Game Trump Tight" (performed by Snoop Dogg, JT The Bigga Figga and Kutfather)

2001

Mix Master Mike - Spin Psycle
 08. "Ice Age" (performed by Encore)

Boom Bap Project - Circumstance Dictates
 02. "Writers Guild"
 03. "Odds on Favorite" (featuring L*Roneous)
 04. "All Stars" (featuring Black Anger)
 06. "The Trade"
 07. "Net Worth" (featuring Pep Love)
 09. "All I Have Left" (featuring JFK, Snafu and Toni Hill)

Kutfather - Hard Core / Transmission
 01. "Hard Core"

2002

Musab - Respect the Life
 09. "The Reckoning"

2003

DJ Babu - Duck Season Vol. 2
 06. "Ends to Means" (performed by Rakaa-Iriscience)

Rasco - Escape from Alcatraz
 04 "The Sweet Science"
 05 "Put Your Hands Up"
 09 "We Get Live"
 10. "San Fran To The Town" (featuring Casual) 

G-Unit - Beg for Mercy
 08. "Betta Ask Somebody"

Sly Boogy - Judgement Day
 04. "Fatal Mistake"
 12. "Walk With My Dogs"
 18. "Sashay"

Lyricist Lounge: West Coast
 04. "Super Education Part 2" (performed by Arcee, featuring Encore)

Krondon - Feels Good / The Way A Nigga Think
 01. "Feels Good"

2004

Gift of Gab - 4th Dimensional Rocketships Going Up
 01. "The Ride of Your Life"
 02. "Rat Race"
 05. "Flashback"
 06. "Up"
 08. "To Know You" 
 10. "Hold On"
 11. "In a Minute Doe" 
 12. "Evolution"
 13. "Moonshine"

De La Soul - The Grind Date
 09. "Days of Our Lives"
 12. "Rock Co.Kane Flow" (featuring MF Doom)

Kardinal Offishall - Kill Bloodclott Bill
 11. "Fallback"

Planet Asia - The Grand Opening
 15. "As Long As I'm Alive"

Encore - Layover
 02. "Layover"
 04. "Step It Up or Wrap It Up"
 05. "Zigga Zigga"
 07. "The Schizm"
 08. "My Way Home"
 10. "Chocolate Pop Corn" (featuring Choklate)
 11. "Essentially Yours"

Vast Aire - Look Mom... No Hands
 05. "Viewtiful Flow"

MF Doom - MM..LeftOvers
 06. "Hoe Cakes (Jake One Remix)"

Jake One - Tale of the Tape
 01. "Let The Drums Speak"
 02. "Lookin' For Kessell"
 03. "Smack Ya' Back"
 04. "The Hard Wizzle"
 05. "Gangster Mauriat"
 06. "Scream"
 07. "Hommula"
 08. "The Return of Hommie"

2005

Kardinal Offishall - Fire and Glory
 08. "Kaysarasara" (featuring Estelle)

I Self Devine - Self Destruction
 
 02. "This Is It"
 10. "Ice Cold" 
 11. "Everyday Shit" 
 
John Cena - You Can't See Me

 01. "The Time is Now"
 06. "Just Another Day"
 09. "We Didn't Want You To Know" 
 15. "Know The Rep (featuring Freddie Foxxx)
 
Turf Talk - West Coast Vaccine: The Cure

 13. "Sick Wid' It Is The Crew" (featuring E-40)

2006
 
 "Let Go" (from the Joy Denalane album Born & Raised)
 
 "You Ain't Ready" (from the Yummy Bingham album The First Seed)

 "Memories" (from the Deep Rooted album The Second Coming)

2007
 
 "Down In New York City" (from the Evidence album The Weatherman LP)
 
 "Clean Up Man", "Buck The World" (featuring Lyfe Jennings (from the Young Buck album Buck the World)
 
 "Movin on Up", "All of Me" (from the 50 Cent album Curtis)
 
 "Initiated (Nu-Mixx)" (featuring Boot Camp Click (from the posthumous 2Pac album Nu-Mixx Klazzics Vol. 2)
 
 "Don't Kill Me", "Fukk Kramer Radio (Interlude)" (from the Bishop Lamont & DJ Skee mixtape N*gger Noize)
 
 "It's Over" (from the Freeway album Free at Last)
 
 "Beast" (from the Guilty Simpson mixtape Stray Bullets)
 
 "Resist the Temptation (featuring Amel Larrieux" (from the posthumous 2Pac album Best of 2Pac)
 
 "FK 10 (from the Freundeskreis compilation album FK 10-Best Of)
 
 "North By Northwest" (Jake One Remix) (from the Blue Scholars album Joe Metro EP)
 
 "Superburn" & "The Squeeze" (featuring Smif-n-Wessun (from the Lifesavas album Gutterfly: The Soundtrack)

2008
 
 "Digital Motown" (from the Kardinal Offishall album Not 4 Sale)
 
 "4 All My Niggaz" (featuring Planet Asia, Mistah F.A.B. & Ya Boy (from the Black Milk & Bishop Lamont album Caltroit)
 
 "Ready or Not" (from the G-Unit album T.O.S: Terminate on Sight)
 
 "Shed Thy Blood", "Damn Daddy" (from the Prodigy album Product of the 80's)
 
 "High Note" (from the Scarface album Emeritus)
 
 "Differences", "I Can't Decide (Everywhere at Once)" (from the Lyrics Born album Everywhere at Once)
 
 "Where I Been" (from the Skillz album The Million Dollar Backpack)
 
 "Count On Free", "Blauh" (from the Freeway mixtape Month of Madness)

2009
 
 "Ballskin", "Rap Ambush", "Microwave Mayo", "More Rhymin'" (from the DOOM album Born Like This)
 
 "Won't Be Long" (from the Rakim album The Seventh Seal)
 
 "Dream" (from Elzhi mixtape The Leftovers Unmixedtape)
 
 "The Return", "Wake Up", "Yah Have Mercy" (from the D.Black album Ali'Yah)
 
 "Get Right" (featuring Mistah F.A.B. & Baba Zumbi, "Seasoned" (featuring Nightclubber Lang & "Cali" (featuring Spank Pops & J Billion (from the Jern Eye album Vision)
 
 "No Substitute", "Life Line" (featuring One Be Lo (from the Supastition album Splitting Image)

Skyzoo - The Power of Words
 04. "Back On The Map" (featuring Maino)

2010

UE Radio Live - The Official Takeover Round One
 08. "Rock Star" (performed by Freeway)

Canibus - C of Tranquility
 03. "C Scrolls"

T.I. - No Mercy
 09. "Salute"

Cypress Hill - Rise Up
 13. "Armed & Dangerous" 
 
Freeway
 00. "Escalators"

Freeway
 00. "Beautiful Music"

Ghostface Killah - Apollo Kids
 12. "Troublemakers" (featuring Raekwon and Method Man & Redman)

J.Pinder - Code Red
 02. "All That Fire" (featuring Zach Bruce)

Lyrics Born - As U Were
 02. "I Wanna B W/U" 
 06. "I've Lost Myself" (featuring Joyo Velarde) 
 09. "Pushed Aside/Pulled Apart" (featuring Lateef the Truthspeaker) 

The Quiett - Quiet Storm: A Night Record
 02. Never Q.U.I.T.T.

2011

Snoop Dogg - Doggumentary
 01. "Toyz N Da Hood" (featuring Bootsy Collins)
 12. "Gangbang Rookie" (featuring Pilot)

Slim the Mobster
 00. "I Ain't Gonna Say Nothing"

Canibus and Keith Murray as The Undergods - In Gods We Trust – Crush Microphones to Dust
 04. Undergods Roll

Vakill - Armor of God
 03. "Armor of God"
 14. "Armorgeddon (Shit On You)"
 17. "Proof"

E-40 - Revenue Retrievin': Overtime Shift
 16. "Lookin' Back (featuring Devin the Dude)

Freeway
 00. "Snappa Pow" (featuring Peedi Peedi)

Joell Ortiz
 00. "Seven Deuces"

Grynch
 00. "Mister Rogers"

Mayer Hawthorne - How Do You Do
 13. "Henny & Gingerale"

Freeway - The Intermission
 06. "666" (featuring State Property)
 15. "She Makes Me Feel Alright (Remix)" (featuring Wale and Mayer Hawthorne)

Slim the Mobster - War Music
 05. "Back Against the Wall" (featuring Dr. Dre and Sly) 

Longshot
 00. "Real Thing" (featuring Psalm One)

Longshot
 00. "Just Flow"

Snoop Dogg and Wiz Khalifa - Mac & Devin Go to High School
 06. "Let's Go Study" 
 09. "French Inhale" (featuring Mike Posner)

50 Cent mixtape The Big 10
 01. "Body on It"

2012
 
Brother Ali - Mourning in America and Dreaming in Color
 01. "Letter To My Countrymen" (featuring Dr. Cornel West)
 02. "Only Life I Know"	
 03. "Stop The Press"	
 04. "Mourning In America"	
 05. "Gather Round" (featuring Amir Sulaiman)
 06. "Work Everyday"	
 07. "Need A Knot"	
 08. "Won More Hit"	
 09. "Say Amen"
 10. "Fajr"
 11. "Namesake"	
 12. "All You Need"	
 13. "My Beloved" (featuring Choklate and Tone Trezure)
 14. "Singing This Song"

J.Pinder - Careless
 07. "Jet Stream"

Sol - Yours Truly
 07. "Rap Life"
 
Fatal Lucciauno - The Message
 01. "Curtains"
 02. "The Proclamation"
 03. "Drunken Poetry"
 04. "Sinner's Prayer"
 05. "Warm Ups"
 06. "My Caliber"
 07. "Speak On It" (featuring Grynch and Spac3man)
 08. "The Mad Hatter"
 09. "The Life"
 10. "Don't Look Back"
 11. "Cry For Help"

Chase N. Cashe
 00. "Trill Living 4.0"

Grynch - Perspectives
 01. "Perspective"
 02. "So Far" (featuring Brother Ali and Shaprece)
 04. "Mister Rogers" 
 09. "Too High"

Brother Ali - The Bite Marked Heart
 01. "Shine On"
 02. "Electric Energy"
 03. "I'll Be Around" (featuring Phonte and Stokley Williams)
 06. "Haunted Housebroken" (featuring Aby Wolf)
 07. "Bite Marked Heart"

Wiz Khalifa - Taylor Allderdice
 14. "The Grinder"

Joy Denalane
 00. "Should Have Never (Jake One Remix)" (featuring Bilal)

I Self Devine - The Sound of Low Class Amerika
 12. "The World As It Is"
 13. "As It Can Be"

50 Cent - The Lost Tape
 14. "Lay Down (Smoked)" (featuring Ned The Wino)

Rain - The Magic Hour 3
 02. "Live Fast, Die Young"

Fun - Some Nights
 08. "All Alright" 
 
Rick Ross - God Forgives, I Don't
 03. "3 Kings" (featuring Dr. Dre and Jay-Z)

AWAR - The Laws of Nature
 03. "Stairsteps" (featuring Has-Lo)
 06. "Gambling Spot" (featuring DJ Majic)
 08. "Elephant Gun"

Fatal Lucciauno - Respect
 08. "Amazing" (featuring J.Pinder)
 16. "One Love One Purpose"

The Physics - Tomorrow People
 02. "Take A Win"

Craig G - Ramblings of an Angry Old Man
 05. "Effortless" (featuring Chaundon and Big Pooh)

Scoe
 14. "Thank You" (featuring Kendrick Lamar)

Fleeta Partee - Lifemuzik
 04. "Apathy"

Scoe
 00. "Thank You (Remix)" (featuring Kendrick Lamar and Slim the Mobster)

Bambu - One Rifle Per Family
 13. "Boom"

Game - Jesus Piece
 11. "Hallelujah" (featuring Jamie Foxx)

Freeway - Diamond in the Ruff
 01. "Right Back" (featuring Marsha Ambrosius
 03. "The Thirst"
 10. "True" (featuring Wale) 

Wale - Folarin
 07. "Limitless" (featuring Scarface)

Freeway
 "Roc Reloaded" (featuring Peedi Peedi, Young Gunz, Memphis Bleek and Pain In Da Ass)

2013

Brother Ali - Left in the Deck
 01. "Dial Tone"
 02. "Grandma And Them"	
 03. "Digital Age"
 04. "Never Stopin'"	
 05. "Not A Day Goes By"
 06. "Well Okay"
 07. "Steerange"
 08. "Phantom of the Opera"
 09. "Rapper Thing"
 10. "Devil's Arms"

Pitbull - Global Warming: Meltdown
 15. "Do It" (featuring Mayer Hawthorne)

Nickelus F - Vices
 15. "Number 15" (featuring Drake)

Pusha T - Wrath of Caine
 09. "Take My Life" (featuring Andrea Martin)

Fashawn - Champagne & Styrofoam Cups
 10. "Just A Man"

Casual - The Return of the Backpack
 01. "Father Figure"
 02. "Head Jerk (Gimme Boss)"
 03. "Bartender"
 04. "Her Lil Sister"
 05. "They Must Not Know"
 06. "I Wonder"
 07. "Rock Wit Us"
 08. "Don't Come To The West Coast"
 09. "Hole in One"
 10. "Thinkin Bout My Paper"
 11. "Enjoy Yourself"
 12. "Just Like Oakland"
 13. "Times Done Changed"

Chance the Rapper - Acid Rap
 11. "Acid Rain"

Grynch
 00. "Mister Rogers Remix" (featuring Bambu and Slug)

J. Cole
 06. "3 Wishes"

J. Cole - Born Sinner
 05. "Mo Money (Interlude)

Fleeta Partee
 "This Is Hip Hop" (featuring Jarrard Anthony, John Crown and Yirim Seck)

Maybach Music Group - Self Made Vol. 3
 12. "The Great Americans" (Rick Ross featuring Gunplay, Rockie Fresh & Fabolous) 
 14. "Poor Decisions" (Wale featuring Lupe Fiasco and Rick Ross)

Wale - The Gifted
 19. "Hella" (featuring Dom Kennedy and YG)

Wale
 "Winter Schemes" (featuring J. Cole)

Malice and Mario Sweet - Enjoy:Like:Love
 02. "Flo Joe"

Drake - Nothing Was the Same
 05. "Furthest Thing" 

L.E.P. Bogus Boys
 00. "Buck 50"

Mayer Hawthorne - Where Does This Door Go
 05. "Designer Drug" 

AD - Intelligent Design
 09. "Reality Check" (featuring Dice)
 12. "Patience" (featuring Big K.R.I.T. and Che Blaq)
 
2014

50 Cent - Animal Ambition
 08. "Hustler"
 12. "The Funeral Interlude"

Dilated Peoples - Directors of Photography
 07. "Show Me the Way" (featuring Aloe Blacc)

Chris Miles - Birth of Cool
 01. "Time"
 02. "Faces"
 04. "Something"

2015

Tuxedo
 "Number One"

Twiztid - The Darkness
 06. "A Little Fucked Up" 
 15. "Seance" 

Dave B
 00. "The Way"

Dave B - Punch Drunk
 08. "Leaves"

G-Unit - The Beast Is G-Unit
 05. "Boy Boy" 

Dom Kennedy - By Dom Kennedy
 01. "Daddy" 
 05. "What I Tell Kids" 
 07. "Thank You Biggie" 
 
Vursatyl - It's Nothing / Bring It To a Halt (plus Jake One Remix) - EP
 02. "Bring It To a Halt [Jake One Remix]" (featuring DJ Flip Flop)

Wale - The Album About Nothing
 10. "The Success"
 13. "The Matrimony" 

Rick Ross - Black Dollar
 02. "Money Dance" (featuring The-Dream
 06. "Geechie Liberace"
 09. "Drive A Nigga Crazy"

Future - DS2
 15. "The Percocet & Stripper Joint" 

Rick Ross
 00. "Buried In The Streets"
 
Lil Bibby - Free Crack 3
 06. "Speak To Em" (featuring Common)
 
Rick Ross - Black Market
 02. "Smile Mama, Smile" (featuring CeeLo Green)
 06. "Dope Dick"
 16. "Money Dance" (featuring The-Dream) 

First Division - Overworked & Underpaid
 15. "The C.D.C. (Cypher for Disease Control)" (featuring Skoob, Supastition, Torae, Prince Po, Baron and Ruste Juxx)

2016
 
Freeway - Fear of a Free Planet
 06. "Friends" (featuring Styles P)
 
Royce da 5'9" - Layers
 05. "Wait"

Curren$y & Alchemist - The Carrolton Heist Remixed
 02. Black Rally Stripes (Jake One Remix)
 
Hodgy Beats
 00. "Greats"
 
Martell Webster - Emerald District - EP
 01. "The District" (featuring Toine and Oddisee)
 02. "Told 'Em" (featuring Kokayi and Phil Adé)
 03. "Blueprint" (featuring Kingpen Slim)
 04. "Beans"
 
Casey Veggies - Customized Greatly Vol. 4: The Return of the Boy
 12. "Fortress"
 
Dom Kennedy - Los Angeles Is Not For Sale Vol. 1
 08. "96 Cris"
 
Wale
 00. "Groundhog Day"
 
The Weeknd - Starboy
 07. "True Colors" 
 
DJ Khaled – Major Key
 01. "I Got the Keys" (featuring Jay-Z and Future)

2017
 
Future – Future
 09. "Outta Time" 
 
Future – Hndrxx
 03. "Lookin Exotic" 

Tuxedo – Tuxedo II
 01. "Fux with the Tux" 
 02. "2nd Time Around" 
 03. "Take a Picture"
 04. "Rotational"
 05. "Shine" (featuring Gavin Turek)
 06. "Scooter's Groove"
 07. "U Like It"
 08. "Back In Town"
 09. "Special"
 10. "Livin' 4 Your Lovin'"
 11. "July"
 
Playboi Carti – Playboi Carti
 14. "Kelly K" 

ANoyd - A Time and Place
 05. "Name Brand Water" 

Travis Scott
 00. "A Man" 
 
21 Savage – Issa Album
 04. "Bad Business" 
 10. "Dead People" 

Nipsey Hussle
 Been Down feat. Swizz Beatz

2019

Bobby J From Rockaway – Summer Classics
 01. "Bobby J For President"

2020
Kehlani – It Was Good Until It Wasn't
 02. "Can I"
Chloe x Halle – Ungodly Hour
 02. "Forgive Me"
Young Nudy - Anyways
 14. "No Pretending"
Six60 - "Fade Away"

2021
J. Cole - The Off-Season
 03. "My Life feat. 21 Savage & Morray"

Larry June - Orange Print
 01. "From Uncle Herm PT. 3 (Intro) Feat. Herm Lewis
 02. "Tangible Assets"
 12. "Iced Coffee"

G Herbo - 25
 14. "Loyalty"

2022 
Brent Faiyaz - Wasteland
 10. "Rolling Stone"
Freddie Gibbs - $oul $old $eparately
 06. "Lobster Omelette" (featuring Rick Ross)

References

External links
 
 
 

Production discographies
Hip hop discographies
Discographies of American artists